Crypto commonly refers to:
 Cryptography, the practice and study of hiding information
 Cryptocurrency, a type of digital currency based on cryptography

Crypto or Krypto may also refer to:

Cryptography 
 Cryptanalysis, the study of methods for obtaining the meaning of encrypted information
 CRYPTO, an annual cryptography conference
 Crypto++, a cryptography software library
Crypto: How the Code Rebels Beat the Government—Saving Privacy in the Digital Age, a cryptography book by Steven Levy
 Crypto AG, a Swiss manufacturer of encrypted communications products

Finance
 Crypto.com, a cryptocurrency exchange

Biology and medicine 
 Cryptococcus (fungus), a genus of fungus that can cause lung disease, meningitis, and other illnesses in humans and animals
 Cryptococcosis (also called cryptococcal disease), a disease caused by Cryptococcus
 Cryptosporidium, a protozoan that can cause-intestinal illness with diarrhea in humans
 Cryptosporidiosis, a parasitic intestinal disease in mammals caused by Cryptosporidium

Fiction 
 Krypto, a dog in the popular comic, cartoon, and movie series
 Krypto the Superdog, an animated series featuring Krypto
 Krypton, a fictional planet in the Superman comics
 Kryptonite, a fictional mineral in the Superman series
 Crypto (film), a 2019 American crime drama thriller film

Games 
 Cryptosporidium (Destroy All Humans!), a protagonist in the Destroy All Humans! video game series
 Krypto (game), a mathematical strategy card game
 Crypto, a character in the video game Apex Legends

See also 
Crypto naming controversy, the controversy about the proper meaning of the term crypto
Crypto Wars, governmental attempts to limit access to strong cryptography
List of cryptocurrencies